Fronto is a genus of true weevils in the tribe Hyperini.

References

External links 

 
 Fronto at insectoid.info

Curculionidae genera
Hyperinae